Ullasa Paravaigal is a 1980 Indian Tamil-language romantic drama film directed by C. V. Rajendran, starring Kamal Haasan and Rati Agnihotri. It was released on 7 March 1980. This film was dubbed into Hindi as Do Dil Deewane. This film was also dubbed in Telugu-language as Prema Pichchi and was released on 21 February 1981.

Plot 

Ravi is in denial about his mental health as a result of the death of his rural love interest (Ravi develops pyrophobia as his lover dies by house-burning plotted by a man). His father and friend Raju hatch a plan to take him overseas to get him treatment for his illness. He meets his childhood friend Nirmala. With the help of Nirmala and Raju, Ravi gets better. The second half of the film deals with how Ravi's uncle tries to kill him to get his hands on his fortune and how Ravi overcomes his uncle.

Cast 
 Kamal Haasan as Ravi
 Rati Agnihotri as Nirmala
 Unni Mary as Ravi's lover in village
 Major Sundarrajan as Madanagopal
 Suruli Rajan as Raju
 Vennira Aadai Moorthy as Film director
 K. Natraj as Rajagopal

Production 
Ullasa Paravaigal was shot extensively in West Germany, France and the United States.

Soundtrack 
The music was composed by Ilaiyaraaja, and lyrics were written by Panchu Arunachalam. The songs "Germaniyin Senthen Malare" and "Dheiveega Raagam" became chartbusters.

Reception 
Kanthan of Kalki wrote that the titular birds were flying high as a Boeing aircraft. Tribune wrote in 1982, "Even the [Kamal Haasan] magic could not sustain this ambitiously produced film, directed by C. V. Rajendran for long as the story slipped more into a travelogue that circled the high, the bright and the night spots of Paris with its suburbs."

References

External links 
 
 
 

1980 films
1980 romantic drama films
1980s Tamil-language films
Films directed by C. V. Rajendran
Films scored by Ilaiyaraaja
Films shot in Bonn
Films set in Bonn
Films shot in Paris
Films set in Paris
Films shot in New York City
Films set in New York City
Films with screenplays by Panchu Arunachalam
Indian romantic drama films